In mathematics, the Artin conductor is a number or ideal associated to a character of a Galois group of a local or global field, introduced by  as an expression appearing in the functional equation of an Artin L-function.

Local Artin conductors

By a result of Artin, the local conductor is an integer. Heuristically, the Artin conductor measures how far the action of the higher ramification groups is from being trivial. In particular, if χ is unramified, then its Artin conductor is zero. Thus if L is unramified over K, then the Artin conductors of all χ are zero.

The wild invariant or Swan conductor of the character is

in other words, the sum of the higher order terms with i > 0.

Global Artin conductors

The global Artin conductor of a representation  of the Galois group G of a finite extension L/K of global fields is an ideal of K, defined to be

Since the local Artin conductor is zero at unramified primes, the above product only need be taken over primes that ramify in L/K.

Artin representation and Artin character

Suppose that L is a finite Galois extension of the local field K, with Galois group G. The Artin character aG of G is the character

and the Artin representation AG is the complex linear representation of G with this character.   asked for a direct construction of the Artin representation.  showed that the Artin representation can be realized over the local field Ql, for any prime l not equal to the residue characteristic p.  showed that it can be realized over the corresponding ring of Witt vectors. It cannot in general be realized over the rationals or over the local field Qp, suggesting that there is no easy way to construct the Artin representation explicitly.

Swan representation

The Swan character swG is given by

where rg is the character of the regular representation and 1 is the character of the trivial representation. The Swan character is the character of a representation of G.  showed that there is a unique projective representation of G over the l-adic integers with character the Swan character.

Applications

The Artin conductor appears in the conductor-discriminant formula for the discriminant of a global field.

The optimal level in the Serre modularity conjecture is expressed in terms of the Artin conductor.

The Artin conductor appears in the functional equation of the Artin L-function.

The Artin and Swan representations are used to defined the conductor of an elliptic curve or abelian variety.

Notes

References

  
 

Number theory
Representation theory
Zeta and L-functions